Maple Ridge-Pitt Meadows News is a community newspaper serving the B.C. Lower Mainland communities of Maple Ridge and Pitt Meadows, located 40 km east of Vancouver. The News is published on Wednesdays and Fridays and is delivered to close to 30,000 homes free of charge.
The paper is a tabloid format and is owned by Black Press.

History
Founded in 1978 as a free-distribution paper called the Local News, The Maple Ridge-Pitt Meadows

Then-publisher Bob Long ran the paper on a ‘shoestring’ with significant input from local writers. In 1983 Gordon Robson took over the assets of the fledgling publication and then in 1985 sold the paper to Hacker Press, which eventually sold to Black Press. The paper then expanded from weekly to twice-weekly with the publication of The Sunday News, extending its reach westward into neighbouring communities, laying the groundwork to launch successful sister papers, the Tri-City News and Burnaby/New Westminster News Leader.

See also
List of newspapers in Canada
 Daily Hive

References

External links
 Official website

Newspapers published in British Columbia
Black Press newspapers
Publications established in 1978
1978 establishments in British Columbia
Biweekly newspapers published in Canada